Jozef Tirer (born 20 February 1984 on Slovakia) is a Slovak footballer who plays for TSU Hafnerbach of the Austrian Regional Leagues as of 2017.

Career in Thailand

Resorting to a Thai club in 2009 on account of having to wait longer to sign for a Slovak team, Tirer started out with TOT S.C. of the Thai Premier League that year. He then represented Nakhon Ratchasima, Bangkok F.C., and PTT Rayong which were in the lower divisions of Thai football at the time.

While playing for Air Force Central in the 2014 Thai Premier League, the Slovak midfielder illegitimately hit the ball with his hand into the goal to make the score 2-2 opposing PTT Rayong. However, the goal counted and he later apologized for the incident.

Comparing the best Thai sides to the outfits in his native Slovakia, Tirer claimed that they would be among the higher-level Slovak teams.

Did not perform well for Ayutthaya F.C. in 2015 which resulted in his eventual release.

References

External links 

 

Living people
Slovak footballers
Slovak expatriate footballers
Expatriate footballers in the Czech Republic
Jozef Tirer
Jozef Tirer
Jozef Tirer
Jozef Tirer
Jozef Tirer
Jozef Tirer
1984 births
Association football midfielders
Expatriate footballers in Austria
Expatriate footballers in Thailand
FC Hlučín players
Jozef Tirer
Jozef Tirer
Jozef Tirer